Cartel is a German hip hop album released in 1995 featuring various artists of Turkish descent. The compilation contains five tracks by Nuremberg artist Karakan, three songs from the Kiel group Da Crime Posse, three songs by Erci E. from West Berlin and a communal recording by all of the artists entitled Cartel.

Spyce Records facilitated the recording of this album under the supervision of their manager Ozan Sinan. Cartel was initially released by Mercury/Polygram, and by RAKS/Polygram in Turkey. The Turkish market consumed over 300,000 copies, providing for widespread notoriety for each of the contributing artists. The German-Turkish community also received the album enthusiastically, although only 20,000 copies were sold within Germany.

The album cover is a blatant allusion to the Turkish flag in that the "c" is manifested by the crescent of Islam. Album manager Oznan Sinan justifies this symbolism by stating that "Our target-group are the Turks not the German society". Similarly, the beats were enriched with samples from Turkish folk music and attempted to unify an ethnic minority within Germany.

Track listing

References

1995 albums